America's Game: The Super Bowl Champions is an American annual documentary series created by NFL Films (broadcast on NFL Network and CBS). Its 57 installments profile the 57 winning teams of the National Football League (NFL)'s annual Super Bowl championship game; each episode chronicles an individual team.

A spin-off debuted on September 18, 2008, titled America's Game: The Missing Rings which chronicled five of the best teams to never win the Super Bowl.

Format
America's Game weaves together archival NFL Films footage, videotape, audio clips, and interviews into a new program with new talking head style interviews from three or more of the winning team (players, coaches, or administrators) and narration from a celebrity.

In instances of teams winning multiple Super Bowls closely together different people are interviewed for each episode. For example, though Bill Belichick coached the New England Patriots to three Super Bowls in four years (2001, 2003, and 2004) he was only interviewed for the episode on the 2004 team. For the original run of 40 episodes, only two subjects were interviewed twice: Bill Curry (1966 Green Bay Packers and 1970 Baltimore Colts) and Joe Greene (1974 and 1978 Pittsburgh Steelers). Recurring interviewers would become more commonplace when the show resumed on an annual format: Eli Manning and Tom Coughlin (2007 and 2011 New York Giants), Ray Lewis (2000 and 2012 Baltimore Ravens), Peyton Manning (2006 Indianapolis Colts and 2015 Denver Broncos), Julian Edelman (2014, 2016 and 2018 New England Patriots), LeGarrette Blount (2016 New England Patriots and 2017 Philadelphia Eagles), Rob Gronkowski and Devin McCourty (2014 and 2018 New England Patriots). Ernie Accorsi and Rich Dalrymple are the only non-players or coaches to be interviewed for the series—both were team administrators.

Of the "Blue Ribbon" top 20 teams, the San Francisco 49ers and Dallas Cowboys are represented most often as a franchise with three championship teams each. The Green Bay Packers, Pittsburgh Steelers, and Oakland/Los Angeles Raiders are each represented twice.

According to Steve Sabol, president of NFL Films, only 20 teams were ranked instead of 40 because they feared negative mail from fans of the franchise whose team was ranked the lowest. Sabol stated that, while the panel chose the 1972 Dolphins as the #1 team, several voters hedged and said Miami's unbeaten season was "the greatest team achievement." Of the voting methods, Sabol said, "That's what I think people were voting on, rather than, 'Could this team beat the '85 Bears?'"

Airing
For its initial airings the show was divided into two waves, with the first series being a weekly series counting down the top 20 winning teams, as selected by a 53-person panel of "Blue Ribbon" experts on the NFL. The first 18 episodes aired on NFL Network beginning in November 2006 and the final two programs on CBS the day before Super Bowl XLI in February 2007.

The remaining 20 champions' episodes aired during the NFL's off-season, February through April, before the 2007 season began. The first episode of the remaining 20 champions aired on Thursday, February 8, 2007.

The show began its run with a one-hour "preview special" at 8:30 p.m. Eastern time on November 17, 2006, followed by the first of the countdown shows the following week. The "official" premiere episode aired on November 24, the day after the first live regular season game telecast on NFL Network.

After some speculation on the future of the series, the 2006 Indianapolis Colts, winners of Super Bowl XLI had their episode air on September 5, 2007, one night before the season opener. The 2007 New York Giants also received an episode, signaling that the series would be annually renewed at the beginning of the next NFL season; the most recent episode, covering the 2020 Tampa Bay Buccaneers, will debut on September 8, 2021.

Unannounced episodes
 Although the 1990 New York Giants, winners of Super Bowl XXV, did not make the top 20 as chosen by the Blue Ribbon panel, their episode's debut was moved up from spring 2007 to the free-preview period of NFL Network that was offered on Cablevision and Time Warner Cable in late 2006. The program debuted on December 29 at 12:31 a.m Eastern (December 28, 9:31 p.m. Pacific). It started 31 minutes late because of the length of the Texas Bowl and a full one-hour NFL Total Access that followed. Although most participating systems were located in the New York tri-state area, some cable viewers in Kansas also received it. Alec Baldwin narrated and Ottis Anderson, Carl Banks and Jeff Hostetler told their experiences of the season.
 The special of the 1971 Dallas Cowboys aired at 1 a.m. Eastern time December 30 (10 p.m. Pacific December 29) as part of the same preview, one week before the scheduled premiere. This was an hour behind schedule, as the Insight Bowl (that aired in place of what would have been a new episode) ended in overtime.

Top twenty
The following list compiles the top 20 Super Bowl teams, as determined by the experts. The teams listed below were revealed in countdown form in the weeks leading up to Super Bowl XLI. The first 18 episodes aired on NFL Network, while the top two teams' specials were shown on CBS on February 3, the day before Super Bowl XLI. Each episode in the top 20 would be introduced with, "NFL Network presents America's Game, a countdown of the 20 greatest Super Bowl champions, and now, number ___"

Non-ranked episodes
Beginning February 8, NFL Network began to broadcast the remaining twenty champions' episodes. The 2005 Steelers were not eligible to be in the Top 20 as the voting was done prior to Super Bowl XL.

Annual specials
Following the original 40-episode run, the show took on an annual format. Beginning with Super Bowl XLI and the 2006 Indianapolis Colts, a new episode would air each September, usually the day before the regular season started, in order to commemorate the reigning Super Bowl Champions. The new episodes would air on NFL Network.

The Missing Rings
A spinoff series, America's Game: The Missing Rings, debuted on September 18, 2008 and aired for five consecutive Thursdays after that, starting at 10 p.m. ET.  In this series, the producers picked five very good teams that came close to winning it all but finished short of Super Bowl victories, and devoted an hour to each of them.  The basic format of the show was the same.  However, the theme song cut off abruptly before the show started, symbolizing the unfinished goals of the teams being profiled.

Availability outside of NFL Network
 The episodes for the #1-ranked and #2-ranked Super Bowl champion teams first aired on CBS on February 3, 2007, the day before Super Bowl XLI. They were reshown on NFL Network, with slightly more footage, on February 5.
 On January 30, 2007, iTunes made twelve episodes (#20 through #9 of the countdown) available for purchase at US $1.99 an episode or US $29.99 for the top twenty teams' episodes.  All episodes, including the "Missing Rings" episodes, are now available.
 During the top-20 countdown portion of the series, episodes were individually made available on DVD on the NFL's official web store, NFLShop.com, the day after their debut. Each episode's DVD art features a close-up of the team's Super Bowl ring.
 Currently, the only format available is Full Frame DVD. The program was filmed and broadcast in high definition but the DVD collection has been formatted as full frame.
 Sky Sports began airing the show in August 2007.
 In Australia, America's Game was previously shown on Network Ten and One HD, but is now aired by 7mate in support of its NFL broadcast rights.
 Hulu reached a deal with the NFL and had almost every episode of America's Game viewable for free on their website. As of late 2012, the series is no longer on Hulu.
 This series has aired on the Televisa Deportes cable network in Mexico in recent years.
 TSN airs America's Game in Canada.
 Gaora Sports airs America's Game in Japan.
 In Australia, Channel One HD played America's Game during the 2011–2013 NFL seasons.  7Mate took over for the 2014 Season but have only showed 2 episodes just prior to Super Bowl XLIX. After Super Bowl XLIX, 7Mate started airing episodes every Saturday from 6 AM. Currently, 7Mate is screening all episodes in the series in order at 10 AM each weekday (although, for no apparent reason, at least two of those episodes were skipped and remain unaired).

See also
 Super Bowl
 List of Super Bowl champions
 NFL Network

References

External links
 

NFL Network original programming
Super Bowl-related television programming
CBS original programming
2000s American documentary television series
2006 American television series debuts